"Angel" is a soul ballad recorded by American singer Aretha Franklin. The song was co-written by Aretha's sister, Carolyn, and Sonny Sanders. Aretha co-produced the song with Quincy Jones and it originally appeared on Aretha's 1973 album Hey Now Hey (The Other Side of the Sky). It was released as a single in June 1973 and went on to top the US R&B Singles chart for two weeks while reaching number twenty on the Pop chart. The single sold over 900,000 copies.

Credits
Lead and background vocals by Aretha Franklin
Additional background vocals by Carolyn Franklin and Erma Franklin
Produced and arranged by Quincy Jones and Aretha Franklin

Simply Red version

British soul and pop band Simply Red covered "Angel" for their first compilation album, Greatest Hits (1996), featuring an uncredited appearance by American hip hop group Fugees. It was released on October 28, 1996, as the only single from the album and reached number four in the United Kingdom. The song also appeared on the Set It Off soundtrack. Simply Red performed it on TOTP, and with Fugees on the MTV Awards.

Critical reception
AllMusic editor Jon O'Brien wrote that the song is "a surprisingly passable attempt at hip-hop lite." Larry Flick from Billboard described it as a "rugged jeep-funk cover" and commented further that "this is far more street-oriented than Simply Red's previous efforts, and front man Mick Hucknall is pushed to deliver one his roughest and most forceful performances to date." He also noted that the singer "sounds convincingly hard alongside Fugee Wyclef Jean's muscular guest rap". Ken Tucker from Entertainment Weekly noted Hucknall's "keening croon to the Fugees' smoky harmonies" and added that "this low-key pleaser exerts a romantic pull". A reviewer from Music & Media wrote that Wyclef Jean and Pras Michel "bring out the best in Mick Hucknall on this hair-raising version", and "his voice can handle any soul ballad on its own, but the unmistakeble Fugees beats and soulful snippets make this a great addition to the Simply Red Greatest Hits album." Alan Jones from Music Week deemed it "a blinding remake" of the Aretha Franklin song.

Music video
A music video was produced to promote the single, directed by Scottish music video, commercial and feature film director Paul Boyd.

Track listings

Charts

Weekly charts

Year-end charts

Release history

Other versions
Kokomo - Kokomo (1975). Lead vocals sung by Paddie McHugh.
Cassandra Wilson - She Who Weeps (1991)
 In 2012, Christine Anu covered the song on her album, Rewind: The Aretha Franklin Songbook.
 In 2019, Irish singer and former member of Westlife Brian McFadden recorded the song for his album Otis featuring Mica Paris.

References

[ Song review] on AllMusic

1973 singles
1973 songs
Aretha Franklin songs
Atlantic Records singles
East West Records singles
Music videos directed by Paul Boyd
Simply Red songs
Song recordings produced by Quincy Jones
Songs written by Carolyn Franklin
Songs written by Sonny Sanders
Soul ballads